DeBardeleben may refer to:

 Henry F. DeBardeleben (1840–1910), American coal magnate
 Henry T. DeBardeleben (1874–1948), American coal magnate
 Joan DeBardeleben, political scientist
 Margaret DeBardeleben Tutwiler (born 1950), American diplomat
 Mike DeBardeleben (1940–2011), American rapist and possible serial killer